is a professional Japanese baseball player. He plays pitcher for the Hokkaido Nippon-Ham Fighters.

External links

 NPB.com

1992 births
Living people
Baseball people from Hokkaido
Japanese baseball players
Nippon Professional Baseball pitchers
Hokkaido Nippon-Ham Fighters players